Robert Torres is the secretary of the Pennsylvania Department of Aging, appointed by Governor Tom Wolf in January 2019. Prior to his appointment, he served as acting secretary of the Department of State.

Education
Torres received his Bachelor of Business Administration from Pace University and his J.D. from Widener University School of Law.

Career
Torres has worked in multiple positions in the Pennsylvania state government, including as deputy secretary for administration in the Pennsylvania Department of Health, and as Pennsylvania's health information technology coordinator.

Torres also previously worked at General Dynamics Information Technology, providing program management and business development services, and served as vice president of Health Information Technology at Capital Blue Cross.

References

Pennsylvania Democrats
Secretaries of the Commonwealth of Pennsylvania